The Andaman masked owl (Tyto deroepstorffi) is a barn owl endemic to the southern Andaman Islands, an archipelago between India and Myanmar, in the Bay of Bengal. Regarded by some authors as a subspecies of the common barn owl (Tyto alba), it is recognized by others as a species in its own right.

Taxonomy
The species was named by Allan Octavian Hume after the collector Frederik Adolph de Roepstorff who shot it at Aberdeen, Andamans. Hume placed it in the genus Strix. Some authors consider this bird to be a subspecies of the barn owl/western barn owl (Tyto alba),or the eastern barn owl (Tyto javanica), but König, in his Owls of the World, recognizes it as a distinct species; one distinguishing feature is that it lacks the greyish veil, speckled with black and white, that all other races of Tyto alba / Tyto javanica possess.

Description
It is almost uniformly dark reddish-brown above, with some speckling of buffish-orange. The facial disc is pale reddish-buff with a distinctive orange-brown margin. The eyes are blackish and the beak creamy-white. The breast is golden-brown with blackish spots, paling towards the belly, which is whitish. The legs are fully feathered to near the feet. The toes are greyish-pink and the claws purplish-grey. The voice has been described as a rather high-pitched, short, rasping, descending shriek which terminates abruptly and is repeated several times.

Distribution and habitat
The Andaman masked owl is known only from the southern Andaman Islands. It occurs on the coastal plain, in fields and gardens with trees, and in human settlements. It is not thought to be migratory.

Ecology
Little is known of the habits of this owl but they are likely to be similar to those of other related species. It is nocturnal, roosting during the day and emerging at dusk. It feeds on small rodents, and the bones of mice and rats have been found in regurgitated pellets beneath roosting places. It probably nests in cavities but details of its breeding habits are not known.

References

Tyto
Birds described in 1875
Birds of the Andaman Islands
Endemic fauna of the Andaman Islands